Selen Öztürk (born 23 July 1980) is a Turkish actress.

Öztürk was born in 1980 in İzmir. Her mother was a Turkish Cypriot, while her father was from Uşak. In 2004, Öztürk graduated from Hacettepe University State Conservatory. Soon after graduation, she moved to Istanbul and started her career on stage. Aside from her career as an actress, she appeared in various movies and TV series, most notably in Muhteşem Yüzyıl as Gülfem Hatun and in Payitaht: Abdülhamid as Seniha Sultan. Since 1994, she has worked as a voice actress and has voiced over characters in the Turkish dubbed version of movies such as The Unbearable Lightness of Being, Léon: The Professional, Layer Cake and Sin City.

Filmography

Film

 Aşkları Ege'de Kaldı - 2002
 Kukla (short Film) - 2007
 Sonsuz - (Nurse Ayten) - 2009
 Çilek - (Ceren) - 2014
 Çiçero  - 2019
 Cep Herkülü: Naim Süleymanoğlu - 2019
 Kağıttan Hayatlar - 2021

Television

 Kara Yılan - (Asiye) - 2007
 Bir Varmış Bir Yokmuş - (Sema) - 2008
 Muhteşem Yüzyıl - (Gülfem Hatun) - 2011–2014
 Benim Adım Gültepe - (Meziyet) - 2014
 Serçe Sarayı - (Aliye) - 2015
 Hatırla Gönül - (Figen) - 2015
 Payitaht: Abdülhamid - (Seniha Sultan) - 2017–2019
 Azize - (Tuna Alpan) - 2019
 Atiye - (Seher Altın) - 2020
 Çocukluk - (Gülay) - 2020
 Misafir - (Nazan) - 2021

References

External links 

 
 

Living people
1980 births
21st-century Turkish actresses
Turkish people of Cypriot descent
Turkish voice actresses
Turkish film actresses
Turkish television actresses
Hacettepe University alumni